Rock Haven or Rockhaven may refer to:

Rock Haven, Fresno County, California
 Rock Haven, San Diego County, California
Rock Haven, Kentucky, an unincorporated community
Rockhaven, Saskatchewan
Rock Haven (film), a 2007 film by David Lewis
Rock Haven (novel), a historical romance novel by Adelyn Bushnell